Al-Sabaa wa Arbain is a town in southern al-Hasakah Governorate, northeastern Syria.

Administratively the town belongs to the Nahiya al-Shaddadah of al-Hasakah District. At the 2004 census, it had a population of 14,177. Nearby localities include al-Shaddadeh to the east.

Syrian civil war

On 10 January 2023, joint forces of the US-led coalition and forces of the SDF launched a counter-terror operation in the village, where 2 ISIS fighters had barricaded themselves inside a house. One ISIS militant killed himself by detonating a suicide vest and the other was shot dead by the joint forces.

References

Populated places in al-Hasakah District
Towns in al-Hasakah Governorate